Hasenbergl is an U-Bahn station in Munich on the U2, and was opened on .

Munich U-Bahn stations
Railway stations in Germany opened in 1996